Aakjær is a Danish surname. Notable people with the surname include:

Jeppe Aakjær (1866–1930), Danish poet and novelist
Lauritz Petersen Aakjær (1883–1959), Danish architect
Nanna Aakjær (1874–1962), Danish carpenter and woodcarver

Danish-language surnames